Lego Brick Sketches is a Lego theme that recreates iconic characters as stylised portraits. The theme was first introduced in June 2020. Following the launch of Lego DOTS, a theme mainly targeted towards children, the Lego Brick Sketches theme is the first bas-relief portraits concept to be launched by the Lego Group in 2020.

Overview 
The product line focuses on brick-built portraits. Each set measures over 5 inches (13 cm) high, 3 inches (9 cm) wide and 1 inch (3 cm) deep and contains at least 170 pieces. Built upon 12 × 16 baseplates, each portrait is formed using either round 1 × 1 tiles or round 1 × 1 plates. It also includes a retractable stand for desktop display and a 2 × 2 inch coupling plate to hang the sketch on a wall to support the portraits. Each sets was designed by Lego Model Designer Chris McVeigh, who was hired by the Lego Group after posting numerous brick sketches to Flickr.

Development 
Before the launch of the Lego Brick Sketches theme, McVeigh explained how he create a brick sketch, he used Lego Digital Designer, a free consumer-level CAD program, to design his piece. He restricts himself to a brick canvas of 12 x 16 inches, roughly the same size as his friends' ink sketches. He then assembles the piece by hand. McVeigh explained, "Creating artwork with LEGOs is much more restrictive than with markers, and it's always a challenge to find just the right combination of plates to represent a specific character," and continued, "Adding to the complexity is that not all parts are available in all colors, and worse yet, I may not have all the parts on hand."

In June 2020, McVeigh discussed how he manage to turn his own designs into official Lego products and explained, "Brick Sketches are something that I did outside of the company. I started doing them back in 2013. It was a format that I really loved, and I wanted to do more of them, but there was only so much free time that I had. Of course, I liked to diversify a bit. I would like to build some other retro tech stuff, so I couldn't always focus on the Brick Sketches. The challenge of Brick Sketches is getting as many details into that small 12 by 16 studs canvas as possible. This was always a really fun thing to do, and I would lose myself for hours trying to rearrange parts and trying to fit more details on that small canvas. Obviously, once I joined the company, this is not something that I could really pursue anymore. It was part of the trade-off to get to work for a great company like LEGO, but you also have to leave some things behind. Brick Sketches were among the other things that I set aside."

McVeigh discussed the concept of development and explained, "One thing that we decided, very quickly, is that most characters would have shoulders. I think this was a good evolution of Brick Sketches, and it's always been necessary with a character like Batman who doesn't really exist without the cowl. Every Batman sketch I've created has had shoulders. We chose to carry this forward to other characters, so the Joker has shoulders, the First Order Stormtrooper has shoulders, and BB-8 has most of his "ball body" anyway. It was a fun thing to add that extra detailing. The other thing – and I don't know if anybody's noticed this yet – but we changed the coloured backgrounds from plates to tiles to give a bit of texture variation. Almost all my original Brick Sketches just had regular plates as a backing, but once I had swapped in tiles I was like, "Yeah, I think that's a good evolution."

McVeigh revealed how the Brick Sketches that fans knew him for became his first product as a professional designer and explained, "One of the themes throughout these conversations, was what can we do promote our brand? What can we do to help give content? At the time the internet, and marketing on the internet, was just blooming. A lot of the other artists in this group who were much better than me at hand drawn stuff started doing what they call 'marker sketches'. Three key people who I knew quite well, Crystal Fontan, Karen Hallion and Megan Lara, would start doing these hand drawn little card sized things with different characters from pop culture."

McVeigh revealed what went into the product development and explained, "When I got inside the company, you look at these things and think what does this mean as a LEGO product? What can we do with it? How can we decide different parameters for it and make sure we stick to those from Brick Sketch to Brick Sketch, so one of the things that we decided early on was the backgrounds would remain with the cut corners because that was part of the DNA of Brick Sketches."

Construction sets 
According to Bricklink, the Lego Group released a total of eight Lego sets as part of the Lego Brick Sketches theme.

Lego Brick Sketches was launched in June 2020. As part of the marketing campaign, the Lego Group released four construction sets. Two sets were released in 2021 and based on Disney cartoon characters. Another two sets will be released in 2022 and based on the fictional Marvel Comics superheroes.

Batman 
Released on 1 June 2020, Batman (set number: 40386) is based on the fictional DC Comics superhero, Batman. It consists of 115 pieces and can be displayed standing up on desks or hung by its built-in hook on a wall.

First Order Stormtrooper 
Released on 1 June 2020, First Order Stormtrooper (set number: 40391) is based on the fictional soldier of Star Wars, First Order Stormtrooper. It consists of 151 pieces and can be displayed standing up on desks or hung by its built-in hook on a wall. In August 2021, The Lego Group announced the First Order Stormtrooper (set number: 40391) was retired on 31 December 2021.

The Joker 
Released on 1 June 2020, The Joker (set number: 40428) is based on the fictional DC Comics supervillain, The Joker. It consists of 170 pieces and can be displayed standing up on desks or hung by its built-in hook on a wall. In August 2021, The Lego Group announced The Joker (set number: 40428) was retired on 31 December 2021.

BB-8 
Released on 1 June 2020, BB-8 (set number: 40431) is based on the fictional droid of Star Wars, BB-8. It consists of 171 pieces and can be displayed standing up on desks or hung by its built-in hook on a wall. In August 2021, The Lego Group announced the BB-8 (set number: 40431) was retired on 31 December 2021.

Mickey Mouse 
Released on 1 March 2021, Mickey Mouse (set number: 40456) is based on the Disney cartoon character of Mickey Mouse. It consists of 118 pieces and can be displayed standing up on desks or hung by its built-in hook on a wall.

Minnie Mouse 
Released on 1 March 2021, Minnie Mouse (set number: 40457) is based on the Disney cartoon character of Minnie Mouse. It consists of 140 pieces and can be displayed standing up on desks or hung by its built-in hook on a wall.

Iron Man 
Released on 1 April 2022, Iron Man (set number: 40535) is based on the fictional Marvel Comics superhero, Iron Man in the Marvel Cinematic Universe (MCU) media franchise. It consists of 200 pieces and can be displayed standing up on desks or hung by its built-in hook on a wall. The initial original design of Iron Man Brick Sketches model created by Chris McVeigh which posted to Flickr in August 2013. In nine years later, the original design has been upgraded and became an official set.

Miles Morales 
Released on 1 April 2022, Miles Morales (set number: 40536) is based on the fictional Marvel Comics superhero, Miles Morales. It consists of 214 pieces and can be displayed standing up on desks or hung by its built-in hook on a wall.

See also 
 Lego Art
 Lego DOTS
 Lego BrickHeadz
 Lego Batman
 The Lego Batman Movie (Lego theme)
 Lego Super Heroes
 Lego Disney
 Lego Star Wars

References

External links
 

Lego
Lego themes
Products introduced in 2020